
The following lists events that happened during 1805 in South Africa.

Events
 The Napoleonic Wars break out between France and the United Kingdom
 July – A British expeditionary force sets sail from Great Britain to re-occupy the Cape Colony
 28 April – The Huguenots consecrated the Strooidakkerk (thatched church) in Paarl
 24 December – A British warship arrives at the Cape Colony and attacks 2 supply ships

References

See Years in South Africa for list of References

History of South Africa